Awaz may refer to:

Awaz, a Pakistani musical band
Awaz (album)
Awaz (1978 film), a Pakistani film
Awaaz, a 1984 Indian Hindi-language film by Shakti Samanta
Awaz - Dil Se Dil Tak, Indian television series
Awaz Television Network, a Sindhi-language television channel
Awaz, South Khorasan, a village in South Khorasan Province, Iran
Awaz Sayeed, Indian Urdu writer

See also
Avaz (disambiguation)